Daniel Touche (born 16 July 1939) is a French gymnast. He competed in eight events at the 1960 Summer Olympics.

References

External links
 

1939 births
Living people
French male artistic gymnasts
Olympic gymnasts of France
Gymnasts at the 1960 Summer Olympics
Sportspeople from Versailles, Yvelines
20th-century French people